Janbaaz is a Pakistani television series and  sequel to the 1984 television series Andhera Ujala.It premiered on Express Entertainment on 13 November 2019. The show is based on Police force Academy where officers are trained to serve the nation. Produced by Satish Anand under Eveready Pictures, it stars Danish Taimoor, Irfan Khoosat, Qavi Khan, Ayaz Samoo, Rashid Farooqi, Areeba Habib and Sonia Rao in pivot roles.

Cast 
 Danish Taimoor as ASP Jasim Tahir
 Irfan Khoosat as Havaldar Karam Dad
 Qavi Khan as Retd SP/Head of Police Reforms Committee (PRC) Tahir Ali Khan
 Ayaz Samoo as ASI Dildar Khan
 Rashid Farooqi as Inspector Nadir Hussain
 Areeba Habib as Forensic Expert Doctor Taniya
 Hamza Firdous as Sub Inspector Saleem
 Sonia Rao as ASI Sameera
 Khawaja Saleem as Constable Shakir Saeen
 Irfan Motiwala as Constable Kamran Shah
 Younus Arshad as Forensic Junior Faisal
 Aamir Qureshi as Karim Khan

Production 
Initially the title of the series was Andhera Ujala but the makers change it to Janbaaz.

References

External links 
Official website

2019 Pakistani television series debuts
Pakistani drama television series
Urdu-language television shows
Pakistani television series endings
Janbaaz